Florizel (1768–1791) was a British Thoroughbred racehorse. He was a bay son of Herod foaled in 1768. As a sire he produced 175 winners who won a total of 75,901 pounds. Offspring included Eager (winner of the 1791 Derby), Tartar (St. Leger), Ninety-three (St. Leger), Brilliant, Diomed (winner of the Derby and a great sire in the US, producing Sir Archy), Ulysses, Moustrap, and Admiral. Important daughters included Leveret (dam of Lilliput), Fancy (dam of Rattle), Lucy (dam of Skylark), and the dam of Clifden. Florizel died in 1791.
'Florizel' is on the permanent list, of The International List of Protected Names. Lester Piggott, retired jockey, named his house 'Florizel'.

Sire line tree

Florizel
Brilliant
Moustrap
Crookshanks
Diomed
Centinel
Peacemaker
Stump-the-Dealer
Grey Diomed
Glaucus
Anthony
Sir Charles
Wrangler
Albemarle
Hamlintonian
Diomed (Darnaby)
Hamlintonian (Hancock)
Hamlintonian (Davis)
Randolph
Top Gallant
Truxton
Wonder
Tennessee Oscar
Columbus
Bolivar
Diomed (Lawrence)
Diomed (Ragland)
Diomed (Randolph)
Florizel (Ball)
Tuckahoe
Orphan
Florizel (Turpin)
Richmond
Enterprise
Vingt'un
Diomed (Kennedy)
Grey Diomed (Barksdale)
Eclipse
Monroe
Potomac
Little John
Sir Archy
Cicero
Sir Arthur
Director
Aratus
Grey Archy
Spring Hill
Tecumseh
Young Sir Archy
Columbus
Warbler
Walk-In-The-Water
Timoleon
Washington
Marquis
Sir John Falstaff
Jackson
Boston
Carolinian
Contention
Kosciusko
Pulaski
Clermont
Woodford
Romulus
Greybeard
Napoleon
Virginian
Byron
Mercury
Sidi Hamet
Sir Solomon
Thomas Big Solomon
Rattler
Marylander
Sir Charles
Collier
Andrew
Frank
Wagner
Sir William
Childers
Roanoke
Grey Beard
John Hancock
Muckle John
Sumpter
Almanzor
Brunswick
Henry
Robin Hood
Gerow
John Richards
Corsica
Stockholder
Pumpkin Boy
Arab
Union
Bertrand
McDonough
Richard Singleton
Woodpecker
Bertrand Jr.
John Bascombe
Gauglion Gangle
Cherokee
Whalebone
Marion
Cymon
John Blount
Phoenomenon
Sir Richard
Sir William of Transport
Sir Leslie
Plato
Robin Adair
Gohanna
Occupant
Waxy
Pacific
Epsilon
Saxe Weimer
Crusader
Sir Archy Montorio
Rodolph
Giles Scroggins
Industry
Goldboy
Merlin
Red Gauntlet
Tariff
Hyazim
Wild Bill
Gandor
Copperbottom
Golddust
Rock
Copperbottom (Captain Edwards)
Longwaist
Zinganee
George Martin
Virginius
Muzzle Diomed
Duroc
Sir Lovell
Trouble
Marshal Duroc
Marshall Bertrand
American Eclipse
Forward
Goliah
Paul Clifford
Constellation
Orphan Boy
Lance
Mambrino
Druid
Eclipse (Monmouth)
Godolphin
Medoc
Shark
Cadmus
Mingo
Tom Moore
Job
Sufferer
Ecliptic
Vincente Nolte
Zenith
Eclipse (Brawner)
Eclipse (Trmble)
St. Charles
Cock of the Rock
Romp
American Star
American Star 14
Gracchus
Rob Roy
Fredericksburg
Madison
Doublehead
Constitution
Ulysses
Play or Pay
King William
Admiral
Fortunio
King Bladud
Fidget
Fidget Colt
Bustler
Prizefighter
Swordsman
Spartacus
Buffler
Lenox
Abundance
The Curragh Guide
Master Robert
Skeleton
Drone
Regulator
Bags
Rust
Eager
Slapbang
Tartar
Ninety-three

References

1768 racehorse births
1791 racehorse deaths
Racehorses bred in the Kingdom of Great Britain
Racehorses trained in the Kingdom of Great Britain
Thoroughbred family 5
Byerley Turk sire line